Fuxing District is a district of the city of Handan, Hebei province, China, with a population of 250,000 residing in an area of .

Administrative divisions
The district has control over 7 subdistricts and 1 township.

Subdistricts: 
Shengliqiao Subdistrict, Pangcun Subdistrict, Tieludayuan Subdistrict, Shihua Subdistrict, Hualin Road Subdistrict, Erliuqisan Subdistrict, Baijiacun Subdistrict

The only township is Pengjiazhai Township

References

External links

County-level divisions of Hebei
Handan